Golzar (also Gulzar) is a village in  Kabul Province, Afghanistan.

See also 
Kabul Province

References

Populated places in Kabul Province